Nowjeh Deh (also known as Navādeh, Now Deh, Nuadeh, and Nūjadeh) is a village in Dowlatabad Rural District, in the Central District of Namin County, Ardabil Province, Iran. At the 2006 census, its population was 447, in 99 families.

References 

Towns and villages in Namin County